This list is of the Places of Scenic Beauty of Japan located within the Prefecture of Akita.

National Places of Scenic Beauty
As of 1 July 2020, six Places have been designated at a national level (including one *Special Place of Scenic Beauty); Lake Towada-Oirase River spans the prefectural borders with Aomori and Landscape of Oku no Hosomichi is a serial designation spanning ten prefectures.

Prefectural Places of Scenic Beauty
As of 20 May 2020, three Places have been designated at a prefectural level.

Municipal Places of Scenic Beauty
As of 1 May 2019, five Places have been designated at a municipal level.

See also
 Cultural Properties of Japan
 List of parks and gardens of Akita Prefecture
 List of Historic Sites of Japan (Akita)
 List of Cultural Properties of Japan - paintings (Akita)

References

External links
  Cultural Properties in Akita Prefecture

Tourist attractions in Akita Prefecture
Places of Scenic Beauty